Vincent Stuart Ltd. was a British publishing company that specialized in mystical and metaphysical books.

Selection of works published
 The Book of Ruth. 1934. 50 copies, designed & hand printed at Flansham.
 Psychological Commentaries. On the Teaching of G.I. Gurdjieff and P.D. Ouspensky, 5 Volumes. Maurice Nicoll. 1952
 The Theory of Celestial Influence. Rodney Collin. 1954
 The Theory of Eternal Life. Rodney Collin. 1956
 MOUNT ANALOGUE: An Authentic Narrative. René Daumal, translation and introduction by Roger Shattuck with a postface by Véra Daumal. 1959
 The Mirror of Light from the Notebooks of Rodney Collin. Rodney Collin. 1959
 The One Work: A Journey Towards the Self. Anne Gage. 1961
 The Philosophy of Compassion: The Return of the Goddess. Esme Wynne-Tyson. 1962.
 Triumphal Chariot of Antimony : With the Commentary of Theodorus Kerckringius. Basilius Valentinus. 1962
 Collectanea Chemica: Being Select Treatises On Alchemy And Hermetic Medicine. Eirenaeus Philalethes, translated by A. E. Waite. 1963
 The Way Within: A Book of Psychological Documentaries. Wyatt Rawson. 1963.

Publishing companies of the United Kingdom
Defunct publishing companies
Defunct mass media companies of the United Kingdom